Smith Row is a group of six Federal-style townhouses within the Georgetown Historic District in Washington, D.C. Built in 1815 by brothers Clement and Walter Smith, the structures extend from 3255–3267 N Street NW.

It was added to the District of Columbia Inventory of Historic Sites in 1964.

References

External links

District of Columbia Inventory of Historic Sites
Federal architecture in Washington, D.C.
Georgetown (Washington, D.C.)
Houses completed in 1815